Ancistrobasis reticulata is a species of sea snail, a marine gastropod mollusk in the family Seguenziidae.

Distribution
This species occurs in the Gulf of Mexico, off Brazil and in European waters.

References

 Clarke A. H. (1974) Molluscs from Baffin Bay and the northern North Atlantic Ocean. Publications in Biological Oceanography, National Museum of Natural Sciences of Canada 7: 1–23.
 Gofas, S.; Le Renard, J.; Bouchet, P. (2001). Mollusca, in: Costello, M.J. et al. (Ed.) (2001). European register of marine species: a check-list of the marine species in Europe and a bibliography of guides to their identification. Collection Patrimoines Naturels, 50: pp. 180–213 
  Rosenberg, G., F. Moretzsohn, and E. F. García. 2009. Gastropoda (Mollusca) of the Gulf of Mexico, pp. 579–699 in Felder, D.L. and D.K. Camp (eds.), Gulf of Mexico–Origins, Waters, and Biota. Biodiversity. Texas A&M Press, College Station, Texas.

External links
  Serge GOFAS, Ángel A. LUQUE, Joan Daniel OLIVER,José TEMPLADO & Alberto SERRA (2021) - The Mollusca of Galicia Bank (NE Atlantic Ocean); European Journal of Taxonomy 785: 1–114

reticulata
Gastropods described in 1844
Taxa named by Rodolfo Amando Philippi